North Lungpher is a village in Mizoram, India. North Lungpher is a medium size village located in Thingsulthliah RD Block of Saitual district, Mizoram, with about 200 families residing there.

Population
As of the 2011 India Census, North Lungpher had a population of 899. Males constituted 57% of the population and females 43%. In North Lungpher, 17.04% of the population is under 6 years of age. North Lungpher is located in the district of Saitual, Mizoram.

The population of children with ages 0–6 is 146 which makes up 17.04% of the total population of the village. The average sex ratio of North Lungpher is 961, which is lower than the Mizoram state average of 976. The child sex ratio for North Lungpher as the census shows is 896, lower than the Mizoram average of 970.

Most of the population in North Lungpher is from Schedule Tribe (ST). ST constitutes 99.53% of the total population. There is no population of Schedule Caste (SC) in North Lungpher.

N.Lungpher village has a higher literacy rate than Mizoram. In 2011, the literacy rate of North Lungpher village was 91.56%, compared to 91.33% in Mizoram. The male literacy was at 90.28%, while the female literacy rate was 92.88%.

As per the constitution of India and the Panchyati Raaj Act, North Lungpher is administrated by Sarpanch (Head of Village) who is an elected representative of the village.

Geography

North Lungpher settlements are located between Chalfilh Tlang, the 6th highest mountain, and Mawmrang mountain range in Mizoram. It is located at an average elevation of 3,325 ft (1,013.5 m) above sea level. The geographical location of North Lungpher is between 23°47'21" - 23°47'01" N latitude and 92°58'22" - 92°58'43" E longitude. North Lungpher experiences a southwest monsoon in summer. The annual rainfall record at some places is 289 cm per year. The temperature of the village is neither too hot nor too cold. The village hardly exceeds 30 °C at summer and never fall below 5 °C during winter. All these above factors shaped the growth of vegetation and the village area is currently well vegetated.

Flora
More than 50% of the village area, now, is covered by thick forest, but the continuous practice of Jhumming, and non-agricultural land use like buildings, transportations like agricultural road and communication utilities etc. in the area led to a decline in the forest cover area. The region falls under the direct influence of southwest monsoon. As such, the region receives an adequate amount of rainfall. The climate is humid tropical, characterized by short winter, long summer with heavy rainfall. Currently, there are enough land resources for cultivation of different vegetables and cash crops. The village forest is an open access and is where the villagers go for their everyday needs like fodder and firewood etc. Although the village forest is an open access, but trading the forest products like timber, firewood and charcoal production are strictly prohibited. But are still open accesses for consumption. Some area of the land are protected by the villagers by planting useful species of trees like Ngiau (Michelia Champaca), Vang (Albizzia Stipulate), Khiang (Schima Wallichi) etc. Planting of trees is also done with the help of Village Forest Department Committee (VFDC) and Young Mizo Association (YMA). Vast areas of land are owned by individuals and are mainly used for cultivation. Current forest status shows decreases in forest cover due to the continuous practice of Shifting cultivation.

History
North Lungpher was founded by Sailo king named Lalzika and his friends in 1918. They separated from Buhban Village, which is 9 kilometers away from North Lungpher. North Lungpher is now more populated than their original village Buhban.

Economy

The majority of the people of N.Lungpher depend on Agriculture and horticulture for their livelihood. Apart from these, a small population including immigrants relying on livestock. The village approached road, which is the unmetalled road, is 15 km long from the metalled road of Saitual Town - Phullen village. Although agriculture has become the main source of income for the communities, most of the products are sold outside the village especially through Middleman. Marketing through middlemen has reduced the amount of money that could be earned by the primary producers from the export of vegetables and cash crops. Ginger is intensively grown by the farmers of N.Lungpher since the land in N.Lungpher village area is highly capable of growing such a crop in Kharif season. Nearly 90% of the total exported agricultural products from the village to the Market is Ginger. Since the village is located almost 100 km away from the nearest city, the farmers of N.Lungpher village did not have the opportunity to sell their products in a distant market, they need to go through middlemen in order to sell their products, but marketing through middlemen has reduced the amount of money that could be earned by the primary producers from the export of vegetables and cash crops. Rice/paddy, Bal, Maize, Brinjal and Samtawk are also the commonly cultivated vegetables and cash crops which are produced in a large quantity. The villagers can have a good deal of production without introducing fertilizers. But, as the population is increasing as well as household, there will be a growing pressure on land for cultivation. Therefore, it is imperative to introduce organic fertilizer in order to optimize the land use and increase in production.

Religious composition
According to 2011 census, North Lungpher's religious composition is recorded as 100% Christianity. Among the different denominations of Mizoram, North Lungpher is made up of three churches of different denominations, UPC N.E.I., UPC Mizoram and Presbyterian. Presbyterian has the largest number of members which currently is 55% of the total population, while UPC N.E.I is 35% and UPC of Mizoram constitutes 10%.

Education

Government Primary school
The primary school in North Lungpher has been governed by the government of Mizoram since 1946. All the school activities under SSA were successfully run by the school. They currently have about 55 students and their current headmistress is Madam K. Laldanglovi.

Government Middle school
Govt. Middle School, North Lungpher is under the government of Mizoram now. It was established in 1974, and currently, has 40 students enrolled. The headmaster K. Lalthazuala was transferred to Saitual, and no other headmaster was given to them, so one of the senior teachers was temporarily selected as the headmaster.

High school
A private high school was established by the Village Council and the other NGOs in 1990, looking forward to the social-economic importance it could give to the people living there. Currently, the high school was under the deficit and has about 25 students enrolled. They are under the head of Pu Lalhlupuia Zote.

Centenary English Medium School
Like many other English Medium Schools in the region, Centenary English Medium School (CEMS) is a co-educational, private school located in Venglai, North Lungpher. Centenary English Medium School was founded in the year 2017 March by Lalchharliana, due to the high demand from the local people who prefer English as the medium of teaching in School. The school offers primary sections including Nursery, Kindergarten, Class I, II and Class III and yet to add more classes in the coming years. The school has 43 students enrolled in the academic session of 2017-2018. The principal of the school is Lalchuailova.

Media

Newspapers 
Mizoram's popular daily newspapers Vanglaini and Aizawl Post reach the village mainly at the evening. Nearly 15 families are subscribed to the biggest newspaper in Mizoram.

Local newspaper

Cable television

Civil administration
North Lungpher has one Village Council Court. Village Council Court was established there in 1954, which is 36 years after the village was established. Currently, the President is Pu Zuutluanga. The Young Mizo Association (YMA) has a branch here, which was formed in 1948. The current President is Pu K.Lalchhanhima. Mizo Hmeichhe Insuihkhawm Pawl (MHIP), the biggest NGO among women, was also established in the year of 1977, 29 years after the Young Mizo Association started a branch. The current MHIP president is Pi Ramawii. Among the NGOs, MUP (Mizoram Upa Pawl) also played an important role in the village and was established in 1985.

Notable people
Lalkima Zote, one of the top artists in the 1980s
Lalrinnunga Ralte, 2nd Runner Up, LPS COMEDIAN SEARCH,Season 12
Pastor Chhuahkhama, the first Christian Pastor among Mizos

References 

Villages in Aizawl district